Peter Wood (born 27 January 1946) is  a former Australian rules footballer who played with Fitzroy in the Victorian Football League (VFL).

Notes

External links 

Living people
1946 births
Australian rules footballers from Victoria (Australia)
Fitzroy Football Club players
Oakleigh Football Club players
Camperdown Football Club players